Transgelin-3 or neuron protein NP25 is a protein that is in the nerve cells of humans, rats, mouses, and chickens. It is encoded by the TAGLN3 gene.

References

Further reading